George Broughton was an English professional rugby league footballer who played in the 1920s.

Playing career

International honours
George Broughton won a cap for England while at Leeds in 1924 against Other Nationalities.

Challenge Cup Final appearances
George Broughton played  in Hunslet's 11-5 victory over Widnes in the 1933–34 Challenge Cup Final during the 1933–34 season at Wembley Stadium, London on Saturday 5 May 1934, in front of a crowd of 41,280.

County Cup Final appearances
George Broughton played , i.e. number 2, in the Hunslet FC's 7-13 defeat by Hull Kingston Rovers in the 1929–30 Yorkshire County Cup Final during the 1929–30 season at Headingley Rugby Stadium, Leeds on Saturday 30 November 1929, in front of a crowd of 11,000.

Club career
George Broughton made his début for Leeds against Barrow at Little Park Roose, Barrow-in-Furness on Wednesday 5 September 1923.

Genealogical Information
George Broughton was the father of the rugby league footballer; George Broughton Jr.

References

External links

England national rugby league team players
English rugby league players
Hunslet F.C. (1883) players
Leeds Rhinos players
Place of birth missing
Place of death missing
Rugby league wingers
Year of birth missing
Year of death missing